Los Dúo, Vol. 2 is the twenty-ninth studio album by Mexicanmusician Juan Gabriel, released on December 11, 2015. It features artists performing duets with Juan Gabriel.  The album won Album of the Year and Best Traditional Pop Vocal Album at the 17th Annual Latin Grammy Awards.

Track listing

DVD
A DVD was included as a bonus with the album.

Charts

Weekly charts

Year-end charts

Certifications

See also
List of number-one albums of 2015 (Mexico)
List of number-one Billboard Latin Albums from the 2010s

References

External links

Juan Gabriel albums
2015 albums
Spanish-language albums
Fonovisa Records albums
Vocal duet albums
Sequel albums
Latin Grammy Award winners for Album of the Year
Latin Grammy Award for Best Traditional Pop Vocal Album